The Rifleman is an American Western television program that starred Chuck Connors as homesteader Lucas McCain and Johnny Crawford as his son, Mark McCain. The series was set in the 1880s in the town of North Fork, New Mexico Territory and was filmed in black-and-white with a half hour running time. The Rifleman aired on ABC from September 30, 1958 to April 8, 1963 as a production of Four Star Television. There were 168 episodes in the series.

Series overview

Episodes

Season 1 (1958–59)

Season 2 (1959–60)

Season 3 (1960–61)

Season 4 (1961–62)

Season 5 (1962–63)

References
 
 

Lists of American Western (genre) television series episodes